Strumigenys lacunosa is a species of reddish-brown ant up to 3.4 mm in length. It is endemic to Taiwan.

This species can be distinguished from all congeners by the ornate lacunose sculpturing on the head, mesosoma, petiole and postpetiole which gives the ant its specific name.

References

Myrmicinae
Insects described in 1996
Endemic fauna of Taiwan
Insects of Taiwan
Hymenoptera of Asia